KK Kožuv is a basketball club based in Gevgelija, North Macedonia. They currently play in the Macedonian First League.

History
The club was founded in 1955.

Kozhuv's biggest success came in 2013, they made the Macedonian First League playoff final but ended up losing against MZT Skopje Aerodrom.
Kozhuv reached the Macedonian Cup Final in 2015. The lost the final match against the heavy-weight Rabotnichki 66-74 .Kozhuv also competed in BIBL league for 6 seasons. They reached the 3rd place twice in seasons 2015 and 2016.

BIBL League Seasons 
 2013: (4-4) 7th
 2014: (5-11) 9th
 2015: (13-3) 3rd 
 2016: (6-8) 3rd 
 2017: (9-9) 5th
 2019: (3-9) 5th

Honours

Domestic Achievements  
 Macedonian League Finalist - 2013 
 Macedonian Cup Finalist - 2015

Current roster

Depth chart

Former players

 Dimitar Karadzovski
 Pero Blazevski
 Kiril Pavlovski
 Darko Radulović
 Zlatko Gocevski
 Vladimir Brčkov
 Aleksandar Šterjov
 Igor Penov
 Stojan Gjuroski
 Kiril Toshev 
 Ranko Mamuzić
 Nikola Karakolev
 Daniel Nacevski
 Ivica Dimcevski
 Martin Shalev
 Bojan Krstevski
 Bojan Trajkovski
 Boban Stajic
 Predrag Pajic
 Jetmir Zeqiri
 Dimitar Mirakovski
 Vojče Lefkoski
 Marko Simonovski
 Ratko Varda
 Miladin Peković
 Igor Mijajlović
 Vladimir Filipović
 Milivoje Mijović
 Filip Šepa
 Slobodan Božović
 Slobodan Dunđerski
 Milan Janjušević
 Slaven Čupković
 Vladimir Ivelja
 Nikola Djurasović
 Uros Lukovic
 Draško Albijanić
 Aleksej Nešović 
 Kenyon McNeail
 Larry Hall
 Jason Carter
 Austin Dufault
 Brandon Penn
 Ryan White

References

External links
 Team info at MKF
 
 Eurobasket.com KK Kozuv Page
 Team info at BalkanLeague

Basketball teams in North Macedonia
Gevgelija Municipality